John O'Donoghue may refer to:

 John O'Donoghue (politician) (born 1956), Irish Fianna Fáil politician
 John O'Donoghue (TV presenter),  Irish journalist
 John O'Donoghue (1960s pitcher) (born 1939), American player
 John O'Donoghue (1990s pitcher) (born 1969), American baseball player
John O'Donoghue (poet) (1954–2008), Irish Catholic poet, spiritual writer and philosopher
John O'Donoghue (hurler) (born 1942), former Irish hurler